"Fiesta En America" (English: "Party in the Americas") is a song written by Honorio Herrero and performed by Puerto Rican singer Chayanne. A portuguese version titled "Canta America" was recorded by the singer for the Brazilian edition for the album. It was released as his first single from his third album Chayanne. The song was re-recorded as a rock version. The version last to 6 minutes. It was included in Grandes Éxitos.

Chart performance
The single was peaked at number 4 in the Billboard Hot Latin Tracks chart on October 10, 1987. It also ranked 49th in the 2008 recap for the '100 Greatest Songs of the 80's in Spanish' by VH1 Latin America.

Remixes
"Fiesta en America (Version 12)" – 5:40

Music video
A music video, directed by the singer's then manager Gustavo Sanchez, was filmed featuring Chayanne dancing with other people around the streets in the Old San Juan. It was included in Grandes Éxitos DVD.

References

1987 singles
Chayanne songs
Spanish-language songs
CBS Discos singles